Red Chillies Entertainment is an Indian visual effects, production and distribution company established by actor Shah Rukh Khan and his wife Gauri Khan in 2002. It was transformed from the defunct Dreamz Unlimited. Based in Mumbai, the studio's activities span across creative development, production, marketing, distribution, licensing, merchandising and syndication of films in India and worldwide. They are also a visual effects company. Throughout the last several years, Red Chillies has acquired the rights to several Hindi films.

In 2006, RCE started a visual effects studio known as Red Chillies VFX. The company also has a 55% stake in the Indian Premier League cricket team Kolkata Knight Riders (2008) and Trinbago Knight Riders (2015) of Caribbean Premier League along with Abu Dhabi Knight Riders (2022) of International League T20.

Sanjiv Chawla was the former CEO of the company, while Gauri Khan serves as a producer and Shah Rukh Khan as the founder and CMD.  In February 2013, Venky Mysore, the CEO of Kolkata Knight Riders took over additional responsibility as chief of Red Chillies Entertainment as well. Gaurav Verma serves as the producer and Chief Operating Officer (COO) at Red Chillies Entertainment.

History

1999–2004
Originally known as Dreams Unlimited and founded in 1999 by Shah Rukh Khan with Juhi Chawla and director Aziz Mirza, the company's first production was Phir Bhi Dil Hai Hindustani, which released in 2000. The film turned out to be commercially unsuccessful. The company's next productions were the 2001 historical drama Aśoka and the 2003 romantic drama Chalte Chalte. The later two emerged as 'hit' at the box office.

In 2003, choreographer Farah Khan, a good friend of Khan, decided to revive the plan of directing a film starring him. The project which was originally planned in 2001 but was delayed as Khan got badly injured while shooting an action sequence for Shakti: The Power (2002) due to which he suffered pain in filming for his other projects. He then took over his production company Dreamz Unlimited and transformed it into Red Chillies Entertainment with his wife Gauri Khan, who became the producer of the first production Main Hoon Na (2004).

2004–2010
The production house released Main Hoon Na in 2004, which did well at the box office, becoming the second highest-grossing film of the year. Khan also starred in the company's 2nd release, the 2005 movie Paheli, belonging to genre of Indian Parallel Cinema, the film was critically acclaimed and was selected as India's official entry to the 78th Academy Awards in the Best Foreign Language Film category.

The third film produced by the company was Farah Khan's mega-budget Om Shanti Om, which was released in November 2007. The film was set in the 1970s and 2000s and paid tribute to Indian film industry of both these eras. Upon release, it broke many box office records, grossing over  1.49 billion and thus became the highest-grossing Hindi film of all-time at the time of its release. The 2009 film Billu starring Irrfan Khan and Lara Dutta was the company's next release, the film opened to good reviews, but was a failure at the box office. The film made by Roshan Abbas, Always Kabhi Kabhi, did poorly. They also produced My Name Is Khan helmed by Karan Johar which was also co-produced by Dharma Productions and it was declared a critical and commercial success.

2010–present
The company continued working on other projects until finally deciding on Ra.One (2011) starring Khan himself, Kareena Kapoor and Arjun Rampal. The pre-production work began in 2007 after the release of Om Shanti Om. The film's crew consisted of more than 5,000 members from India, Italy and the US, and was pieced together by more than 1,000 people, working in shifts, in around 15 studios across the world. It saw the inclusion of several visual effects techniques being incorporated in the production which were carried out by Red Chillies VFX. With an estimated budget of  1.25 billion, Ra.One was the second-most expensive film ever produced in Indian cinema, and the most expensive Bollywood film. The film witnessed a level of publicity campaigning previously unseen in India films, with marketing taking place over a period of nine months and involving major brand tie-ups of a 52 crore (US$9.88 million) which set the record for the largest marketing budget in India. Shah Rukh Khan decided to dedicate Ra.One to his friend and former CEO Sanjiv Chawla, since he stepped down due to ill health.

The film released across 3,100 screens in India and 904 prints overseas in both 2D and 3D, making it the largest Indian cinematic release in the world. The film went on to break multiple box-office records and according to its distributors, became the second highest-grossing Bollywood film worldwide at that time, earning over  2.4 billion. Their next production was Karan Johar's directorial venture, Student of the Year (2012), which was co-produced by Johar's production company. The company is reportedly targeting a 25 per cent annual business growth, and is set to roll out four to five films, but the Bollywood superstar says he won't act in them.

"We want to make four-five films without me. As a producer I would like to concentrate on the films and visual effects," Shah Rukh told IANS in an interview.

Badla (2019) was one such film that didn't star Shah Rukh Khan. It featured Amitabh Bachchan and Taapsee Pannu in lead roles, and was directed by Sujoy Ghosh. It is a mystery thriller that was produced by Red Chillies Entertainment and Azure Entertainment, in which businesswoman Naina Sethi (Pannu) hires lawyer Badal Gupta (Bachchan) to clear her name as a suspect in the murder of her lover.

The production house launched their first collaboration with Netflix India, Bard of Blood, 2019. Based on the 2015 novel by the same name, this espionage thriller starred Emraan Hashmi in the lead role along with Kirti Kulhari, Vineet Kumar Singh, Jaideep Ahlawat and Sobhita Dhulipala. It is a seven-episode series that revolves around the story of an ex-RAW agent. The series premiered on 27 September 2019 on Netflix.

Kaamyaab co-produced with Drishyam Films starring Sanjay Mishra and Deepak Dobriyal was released on 6 March 2020.

Their next upcoming film, Bob Biswas, in association with Sujoy Ghosh's Bound Script Production is currently on floors. Starring Abhishek Bachchan in the lead, the movie is the directorial debut of Diya Annapurna Ghosh. The film is based on a fictional character from Kaahani (2012), ‘Bob Biswas', who is a poker-faced contract killer.

Filmography

Films produced

Film rights acquired by Red Chillies Entertainment 

Aji Bas Shukriya (1958)
Ujala (1959)
Singapore (1960)
Professor (1962)
Amrapali (1966)
Prince (1969)
Lal Patthar (1971)
Elaan (1971)
Khoon Khoon (1973)
Manoranjan (1974)
Salaakhen (1975)
Chadi Jawani Budhe Nu (1976)
Bandie (1978)
Ratnadeep (1979)
Adventures of Ali-Baba and the Forty Thieves (1980)
Ashanti (1982)
Ek Jaan Hai Hum (1983)
Mandi (1983)
Sohni Mahiwal (1984)
Arjun (1985)
Pyaar Ke Do Pal (1986)
Jaal (1986)
Aakhri Adaalat (1988)
Vardi (1989)
Mujrim (1989)
Yodha (1991)
Love (1991)
Shikari (1991)
Chamatkar (1992)
Maya Memsaab (1993)
Damini (1993)
Aashik Awara (1993)
Kabhi Haan Kabhi Naa (1994)
Yaar Gaddar (1994)
Anjaam (1994)
Dushmani: A Violent Love Story (1995)
Ram Jaane (1995)
Oh Darling! Yeh Hai India! (1995)
Ajay (1996)
English Babu Desi Mem (1996)
Chaahat (1996)
Yes Boss (1997)
Qila (1998)
Dil Se.. (1998)
Hey Ram (2000)
One 2 Ka 4 (2001)
Devdas (2002)
Hum Tumhare Hain Sanam (2002)
Dum (2003)
Swades (2004)
Yuva (2004)
Guru (2007)

Visual effects studio 
Red Chillies Entertainment Pvt. Ltd. has a visual effects studio known as redchillies.vfx which started off in 2006. Apart from home productions, the VFX team had been involved with many major movies like Chak De! India, Krrish 3, Don: The Chase Begins Again, Dostana and De Dana Dan. The division has won accolades for its work in India and abroad. Some of the major awards won by the team:
 In 2006, Don: The Chase Begins won European accolades for Best Special Effects. 
 In 2007, Om Shanti Om won best visual effects from Filmfare, Zee cine, IIFA, Star Screen, Indy's and Apsara Producer's Guild Awards.
 In 2011, Ra.One swept all major awards in Bollywood for visual effects,  including a National Film Award and Filmfare Award for Best Special Effects and was nominated for the Asian Film Award as well. The division has the largest manpower among the group companies with a staff strength of over 130.
 In 2016, Fan won best special effects award from Filmfare.
 In 2018, Zero won best visual effects award from Filmfare and Zee Cine.

The Studio was involved in following projects:

Main Hoon Na (2004)
Paheli (2005)
Don: The Chase Begin Again (2006)
Honeymoon Travels Pvt. Ltd. (2006)
Jhoom Barabar Jhoom (2007)
Chak De! India (2007)
Om Shanti Om (2007)
Krazzy 4 (2008)
Kismat Konnection (2008)
Drona (2008)
Yuvvraaj (2008)
Billu (2009)
What's Your Raashee? (2009)
Kurbaan (2009)
De Dana Dan (2009)
Hum Tum Aur Ghost (2010)
Kites (2010)
Aashayein (2010)
Ra.One (2011)
Don 2 (2011)
Jab Tak Hai Jaan (2012)
Vishwaroopam (2013)
Issaq (2013)
Chennai Express (2013)
Krrish 3 (2013)
Gulaab Gang (2014)
Finding Fanny (2014)
Happy New Year (2014)
Dil Dhadakne Do (2015)
Dilwale (2015)
Fan (2016)
Dear Zindagi (2016)
Khaidi No. 150 (2017)
Raees (2017)
Phillauri (2017)
Sachin: A Billion Dreams (2017)
Tubelight (2017)
Jagga Jasoos (2017)
Jab Harry Met Sejal (2017)
Shubh Mangal Saavdhan (2017)
Ittefaq (2017)
Fukrey Returns (2017)
Sonu Ke Titu Ki Sweety (2018)
Pari (2018)
Sanju (2018)
Genghis Khan (2018)
The Answer (2018)
Happy Phirr Bhag Jayegi (2018)
Manmarziyaan (2018)
Sui Dhaaga (2018)
Chekka Chivantha Vaanam (2018)
Tumbbad (2018)
Zero (2018)
Simmba (2018)
Ek Ladki Ko Dekha Toh Aisa Laga (2019)
Gully Boy (2019)
Anandi Gopal (2019)
Kalank (2019)
De De Pyaar De (2019)
Judgementall Hai Kya (2019)
Jabariya Jodi (2019)
Badla (2019)
Chopsticks (2019)
Prassthanam (2019)
Mamangam (2019)
Saaho (2019)
Mission Mangal (2019)
Sye Raa Narasimha Reddy (2019)
Mardaani 2 (2019)
Panipat (2019)
Pati Patni Aur Woh (2019)
Shikara (2020)
Shubh Mangal Zyada Saavdhan (2020)
Love Aaj Kal (2020)
Thappad (2020)
Baaghi 3 (2020)
Class of '83 (2020)
Gunjan Saxena: The Kargil Girl (2020)
Ludo (2020)
Laxmii (2020)
Bulbbul (2020)
Angrezi Medium (2020)
Roohi (2021)
Saina (2021)
Pagglait (2021)
Irul (2021)
Radhe (2021)
Haseen Dillruba (2021)
Toofaan (2021)
Dhamaka (2021)
99 Songs (2021)
Shershaah (2021)
Tadap (2021)
Atrangi Re (2021)
Gehraiyaan (2022)
Radhe Shyam (2022)
RRR (2022)
Attack (2022)
Bhool Bhulaiyaa 2 (2022)
Good Luck Jerry (2022)
Jhund (2022)
Anek (2022)
Laal Singh Chaddha (2022)
Raksha Bandhan (2022)
Roop Nagar Ke Cheetey (2022)
Dhokha: Round D Corner (2022)
Vikram Vedha (2022)
Ponniyin Selvan: I (2022)

Web series
Bard of blood
Betaal
JL50
Music Video
Jugnu (2021)

Television
An extended five episodes miniseries version of Aśoka aired on Star Plus from 28 May 2002 to 25 June 2002.

A TV production arm Red Chillies Idiot Box was launched in 2009. The unit produced 10 shows, 2 Television films and 1 Theatrical film Men Will Be Men before it was shut down in 2012.

In 2017 it was announced that Red Chillies Entertainment will produce an eight-episode series for Netflix based on the novel The Bard of Blood by Bilal Siddiqi starring Emraan Hashmi, Vineet Kumar Singh, Kirti Kulhari, Sobhita Dhulipala and Jaideep Ahlawat.

Sports

In 2008, Red Chillies acquired ownership rights for the franchise representing Kolkata in the Twenty20 cricket tournament Indian Premier League, for a price of US$75.09 million, and have since named the team Kolkata Knight Riders. KKR is the richest team in the IPL and it has been ranked as the most valued with a brand value of $42.1 million. Financially, KKR is the most profitable franchise in the IPL. The home of the Kolkata Knight Riders is Eden Gardens.

In 2011, they introduced the Mumbai franchise in the motorsport racing league i1 Super Series. In 2012, SRK showed his interest to buy a 50& share of Dempo S.C. Indian football club of I League. He also has a 50% stake in the Caribbean Premier League franchise Trinidad and Tobago Red Steel from 2015 onwards. The team had many popular former players and the current coach of Kolkata Knight Riders, Jacques Kallis and other well-known players like Kamran Akmal, Dwayne Bravo, Johan Botha, Darren Bravo and Cameron Delport etc.

The team cinched their maiden Caribbean Premier League title in 2015, right after Shahrukh Khan became the owner of the franchise. He changed the name and logo of the team the very next season to Trinbago Knight Riders, with the name and the logo being almost identical to KKR.

In 2022, Knight Riders Group acquires Abu Dhabi Knight Riders (ADKR) franchise in UAE International League T20.

References

External links

RedChillies VFX Website

 
Indian Premier League franchise owners
Mass media companies established in 2002
Film distributors of India
Film production companies based in Mumbai
2002 establishments in Maharashtra
Best Special Effects National Film Award winners